Fritz Fromm (12 April 1913 – 13 October 2001) was a German field handball player who competed in the 1936 Summer Olympics.  He was part of the German field handball team, which won a gold medal. He played two matches.

External links
profile

1913 births
2001 deaths
German male handball players
Olympic handball players of Germany
Field handball players at the 1936 Summer Olympics
Olympic gold medalists for Germany
Olympic medalists in handball
Medalists at the 1936 Summer Olympics